Counterspy is a 1953 British thriller film directed by Vernon Sewell and starring Dermot Walsh, Hazel Court and Hermione Baddeley. A mild mannered accountant (Dermot Walsh) comes into possession of secret papers that both the government and a spy ring are after. Alexander Gauge turns in a good performance as a villain rather in the mould of Sydney Greenstreet.

Cast
 Dermot Walsh as Frank Manning  
 Hazel Court as Clare Manning  
 Hermione Baddeley as Madame Del Mar  
 Alexander Gauge as Smith  
 Bill Travers as Rex  
 Archie Duncan as Jim Fenton  
 James Vivian as Larry Fenton  
 Frederick Schrecker as Plattnaur 
 John Penrose as Paulson  
 Hugh Latimer as Inspector Barlow  
 Beryl Baxter as Plattnauer's Accomplice  
 Gwen Bacon as Matron  
 Maxwell Foster as Dr. Stevenson  
 Howard Lang as Policeman  
 Monti DeLyle as Dance Director 
 Frederick Buckland as Police Photographer 
 Reginald Hearne as Detective  
 Paul Rich as Music Hall Singer  
 Edwin Richfield as Safecracker  
 Stuart Saunders as Stagehand 
 Ann Wrigg as Nurse

Critical reception
TV Guide called it "A routine spy picture," and rated it two out of five stars.

References

Bibliography
 Chibnall, Steve & McFarlane, Brian. The British 'B' Film. Palgrave MacMillan, 2009.

External links

1953 films
British mystery films
1950s mystery films
Films set in England
Merton Park Studios films
Films directed by Vernon Sewell
British black-and-white films
Films scored by Eric Spear
1950s English-language films
1950s British films